Borgund may refer to the following places in Norway:

Places

Norway

Møre og Romsdal county
Borgund, Møre og Romsdal, a former municipality now part of Ålesund municipality
Borgund Church, a church in Ålesund municipality

Vestland (Sogn og Fjordane) county
Borgund, Lærdal, a village in Lærdal municipality
Borgund, Sogn og Fjordane, a former municipality now part of Lærdal municipality
Borgund Stave Church, a stave church in Lærdal municipality
Borgund Tunnel, a tunnel in Lærdal municipality
Borgund (also known as Borgundvåg), a village in Selje municipality